Skarzyn  is a village in the administrative district of Gmina Płońsk, within Płońsk County, Masovian Voivodeship, in east-central Poland. It was established by Jan of Skarżyno of the Bończa coat of arms. Around 1436, Jan was granted the land on a knightly right from Bolesław IV, Prince of Mazovia.

References

Skarzyn